The Indian Association for Angiosperm Taxonomy (IAAT) was established in 1990. The IAAT is headquartered at the Department of Botany, Calicut University, Kozhikode, India.
The IAAT is affiliated to the International Association for Plant Taxonomy. It promotes Angiosperm taxonomy in India and acts as a gathering organisation for Angiosperm taxonomists.

Publication
The IAAT publishes a journal Rheedea (named after Hendrik van Rheede).

External links
IAAT website
IAPT
Index Nominum Genericorum

Scientific organisations based in India
Plant taxonomy
Botanical societies
Flora of India (region)
International scientific organizations
Scientific organizations established in 1990
1990 establishments in Kerala